Sapir College (HaMikhlela HaAkademit Sapir) is a college in Israel, located in the northwestern Negev desert near Sderot. It is the largest public college in Israel, with an enrollment of 8,000 students. The college is named after Israeli politician Pinchas Sapir.

History
The communities of Sha'ar HaNegev Regional Council established the college in 1963 as an evening school for adult higher education. It later became an Academic College affiliated with Ben-Gurion University of the Negev. Sapir was granted independent academic accreditation from the Council for Higher Education in 1998.

The college awards Bachelor's degrees in Communication, Cinema and Television, Software Systems, Marketing, Administration and Public Policy, Industrial Management, Law, Human Resources Management, Cultural Studies, Logistics, Economics, and Social Work, as well as a multidisciplinary B.A. in the Humanities and Social Sciences. The college also awards a Master of Arts degree in Administration and Public Policy. The college also offers study in further five subjects (with degrees awarded by Ben-Gurion University of the Negev in Beersheba), and provides training for engineering technicians.

Several annual conferences and events are organized at the college:
 The Sderot Conference for Society is an annual event bringing together political and economical experts to discuss relevant social issues and conflicts.
 The Film Festival of the South - an international film festival organized by the department of film and television.

See also
List of universities and colleges in Israel

References

External links
Official website 
Official website 

 
Colleges in Israel
Film schools in Israel
Sderot
1963 establishments in Israel
Educational institutions established in 1963